Peeples is a surname. Notable people with the surname include:

Aubrey Peeples (born 1993), American actress
Clifford Peeples
George Peeples (born 1943), American basketball player
Joe Henry Peeples, Jr. (1914–1988), American politician
Nia Peeples (born 1961), American singer and actress
Samuel A. Peeples (1917–1997), American writer
William Peeples (died 2004), American jazz drummer

See also
Peeple (disambiguation)
People (disambiguation)